Water polo was contested for men only at the 1974 Central American and Caribbean Games in Santo Domingo, Dominican Republic.

References
 

1974 Central American and Caribbean Games
1974
1974 in water polo